is a Japanese rock band founded in 1973 by young classmates Hironobu Kageyama, Hiroyuki Tanaka and Akira Takasaki.

History 
The three founders soon recruited, from their own school, drummer Munetaka Higuchi and keyboard player Shunji Inoue to complete the line-up. The name Lazy was taken from Deep Purple's song of the same name and the music the new band wanted to play was orientated towards hard rock. Managers and producers instead envisioned the young musicians as ideal prototypes for pop icons and created, through the use of monikers, costumes and well-balanced singles, a successful "boy band" for the Japanese teenage market. In contrast with these decisions, the band members started writing and recording their own music, slowly changing the sound of the band from easy-listening pop rock to hard rock. A growing dissatisfaction for the direction the band had taken, and the need to express their musical ability, caused Lazy to split up in 1981.

Each member became known on their own, mainly in the soundtrack recording business, or formed other bands like Loudness. Lazy reformed in 1997 for a new album and a tour, and intermittently in the following years to do several projects together. On September 1, 2006, bassist Tanaka died of heart failure at the age of 46. On November 30, 2008, drummer Higuchi died at the age of 49. Z Hen, performed under the name "Ultimate Lazy for Mazinger". Their most recent project was the 2011 single "Reckless" for the second animated film in the Towa no Quon series.

Members 
Vocals: Hironobu "Michell" Kageyama
Guitar: Akira "Suzy" Takasaki
Keyboard: Shunji "Pocky" Inoue

Former members
Bass: Hiroyuki "Funny" Tanaka (died 2006)
Drums: Munetaka "Davy" Higuchi (died 2008)

Other members
Tamio Okuda has participated in some Lazy projects since the deaths of Hiroyuki Tanaka and Munetaka Higuchi.
Kazuyoshi Saito has participated in some Lazy projects since the deaths of Hiroyuki Tanaka and Munetaka Higuchi.

Discography

Studio albums 
 This is the Lazy (1978/03/05)
 Dream a Dream (1978/12/05)
 Rock Diamond (1979/09/05)
 Lazy V (1980/04/05)
 
 Happy Time (1998/07/21)

EPs 
 Angelique: Eien no Yakusoku (2001/01/24)
 Zone of the Enders (2001/05/23)

Live albums 
 Lazy wo Oikakero (1978/05/06)
 Moetsukita Seishun (1981/04/05)
 Happy Time Tour '98: Kuro Tokin no Nasu ga Mama (1998/04/21)

Compilation albums 
 Collection – Jounetsu no Seishun (1979/03/21)
 Best Hit Lazy (1980/12/01)
 Best (1981)
 Best Collection 1977–1981 (1999/02/21)
 Hit Collection (1999/11/20)
 Golden Best (2004/12/22)

Singles

Videography 
Happy Time Tour '98 ~Kuro Tokin no Nasu ga Mama~ (1998/10/21)
Lazy Live 2002 Uchuusen Chikyuugou II ~Regenerate of a Lasting Worth~ (2002/06/04)

References

External links 
Lazy at Lantis' official website
Lazy at Anison Generation database 
Ultimate Lazy for Mazinger at Anison Generation database 

Japanese hard rock musical groups
Japanese heavy metal musical groups
Japanese pop rock music groups
Musical groups from Osaka
Musical groups established in 1977
Musical groups disestablished in 1981
Musical groups reestablished in 1998